HMS Duc de la Vaguinon (or Duc de la Vaugignon) was the French privateer cutter Duc de la Vauguyon, launched in 1779, that the British captured later that same year. The British took her into the Royal Navy, but she was almost immediately lost; her  total career lasted only about nine months.

Origins
Duc de la Vauginon was probably built at Honfleur. She was launched on 20 March 1779. Her first captain was Nicolas Roger, in April. However, Commandant Marin Le Page replaced him.

Capture
, Captain James Montague, and Countess of Scarborough, Captain Thomas Piercy, shared in the capture, on 17 June 1779, of the French privateers Due de la Vauguyon and Comte de Maurepas. Medea captured Due de la Vauguyon (or Duc de Lavaugnon) of Dunkirk, a cutter of 14 guns and 98 men, after a fight of an hour. The fight cost the French four men killed and ten wounded; Medea had no casualties. The British took her into service as Duc de la Vauginon.}

Duc de la Vauguyon had captured and ransomed a lobster smack sailing from Norway to Britain. The master of the smack informed Montague that the privateer had had a consort. Medeas rigging was too cut up for her to pursue the consort, so Montague sent Piercy after her. Piercy caught up with Compte de Maurepas after a few hours and the privateer struck without resistance.

Fate
Between September and November 1779, Duc De La Vauginon underwent coppering and fitting at Deptford. She was commissioned in September under the command of Lieutenant Charles Jordan. He was still in command when she went missing around 15 December 1779 during a storm in the North Sea.

Notes, citations, and references
Notes

Citations

References
 
 
 

Captured ships
Privateer ships of France
Maritime incidents in 1779
Cutters of the Royal Navy
1779 ships
Missing ships
Warships lost with all hands